Duchesne Academy of the Sacred Heart can refer to:
Duchesne Academy of the Sacred Heart (Omaha, Nebraska)
Duchesne Academy of the Sacred Heart (Houston, Texas)